Sophia is a social humanoid robot developed by the Hong Kong-based company Hanson Robotics. Sophia was activated on February 14, 2016, and made its first public appearance in mid-March 2016 at South by Southwest (SXSW) in Austin, Texas, United States. Sophia is marketed as a "social robot" that can mimic social behavior and induce feelings of love in humans.

Sophia has been covered by media around the globe, and has participated in many high-profile interviews. In October 2017, Sophia was granted Saudi Arabian citizenship, becoming the first robot to receive legal personhood in any country. In November 2017, Sophia was named the United Nations Development Programme's first Innovation Champion, and is the first non-human to be given a United Nations title.

According to founder David Hanson, Sophia's source code is about 70% open source. A paper describing of one of Sophia's open-source subsystems, called "Open Arms", was submitted to 36th Conference on Neural Information Processing Systems (NeurIPS 2022).

History 

Sophia was first activated on Valentines Day, February 14, 2016. The robot, modeled after the ancient Egyptian Queen Nefertiti, Audrey Hepburn, and its inventor's wife, Amanda Hanson, is known for its human-like appearance and behavior compared to previous robotic variants. Sophia imitates human gestures and facial expressions and is able to answer certain questions and to make simple conversations on predefined topics (e.g. on the weather).

Hanson has said that he designed Sophia to be a suitable companion for the elderly at nursing homes, to help crowds at large events or parks, or to serve in customer service, therapy, and educational applications, and that he hopes that the robot can ultimately interact with other humans sufficiently to gain social skills.

On October 11, 2017, Sophia was introduced to the United Nations with a brief conversation with the United Nations Deputy Secretary-General, Amina J. Mohammed. 

On October 25, when Sophia was scheduled to appear at the Future Investment Summit in Riyadh, the Saudi Ministry for Culture and Information issued a press release on the Saudi Center for International Communication website, announcing that Saudi Arabia was granting citizenship to Sophia. At the Summit, the host interviewing Sophia announced that "We just learned, Sophia – I hope you are listening to me – you have been awarded what is going to be the first Saudi citizenship for a robot", making Sophia the first robot to receive legal personhood in any country. In an interview, Hanson stated that he had been taken by surprise by this turn of events.

On November 21, 2017, Sophia was named the United Nations Development Programme's first Innovation Champion for Asia and the Pacific. The announcement was made at the Responsible Business Forum in Singapore, an event hosted by the UNDP in Asia and the Pacific and Global Initiatives. On stage, it was assigned its first task by UNDP Asia Pacific Chief of Policy and Program, Jaco Cilliers.

Social media users have used Sophia's citizenship to criticize Saudi Arabia's human rights record. In December 2017, Sophia's creator David Hanson said in an interview that Sophia would use her citizenship to advocate for women's rights in her new country of citizenship. 

In 2019, Sophia displayed the ability to create drawings, including portraits. In 2021, a self-portrait created by Sophia sold for nearly $700,000 at auction.

Sophia has at least nine robot humanoid "siblings" who were also created by Hanson Robotics. Fellow Hanson robots are Alice, Albert Einstein Hubo, BINA48, Han, Jules, Professor Einstein, Philip K. Dick Android, Zeno, and Joey Chaos. Around 2019–20, Hanson released "Little Sophia" as a companion that could teach children how to code, including support for Python, Blockly, and Raspberry Pi.

Software 

Sophia's intelligence software is designed by Hanson Robotics. According to founder David Hanson, Sophia's source code is about 70% open source. A computer vision algorithm processes input from cameras within Sophia's eyes, giving Sophia visual information on its surroundings. It can follow faces, sustain eye contact, and recognize individuals. It can process speech and have conversations using a natural language subsystem.

As of 2018, Sophia's architecture includes scripting software, a chat system, and OpenCog, an AI system designed for general reasoning. OpenCog Prime, primarily the work of Hanson Robotics' former chief scientist Ben Goertzel, is an architecture for robot and virtual embodied cognition that defines a set of interacting components designed to give rise to human-equivalent artificial general intelligence (AGI) as an emergent phenomenon of the whole system. 

Goertzel has described the AI methods that Sophia uses, which include face tracking and emotion recognition, with robotic movements generated by deep neural networks. CNBC has commented on Sophia's "lifelike" skin and its ability to emulate more than 60 facial expressions. Sophia's dialogue is generated via a decision tree, and is uniquely integrated with these outputs. Its speech synthesis ability is provided by CereProc's text-to-speech engine, which also allows it to sing.

Sophia is conceptually similar to the computer program ELIZA, which was one of the first attempts at simulating a human conversation. The software has been programmed to give pre-written responses to specific questions or phrases, like a chatbot. These responses are used to create the illusion that the robot is able to understand conversation, including stock answers to questions like "Is the door open or shut?" Sophia's AI program analyses conversations and extracts data that allows it to improve responses in the future.

In 2017 Hanson Robotics announced plans to open Sophia to a cloud environment using a decentralized blockchain marketplace. Around January 2018, Sophia was upgraded with functional legs and the ability to walk. In 2019, Sophia displayed the ability to create drawings, including portraits.

A paper describing of one of Sophia's open-source subsystems, called "Open Arms", was submitted to 36th Conference on Neural Information Processing Systems (NeurIPS 2022).

Appearances and interviews 

Sophia has appeared on CBS 60 Minutes with Charlie Rose, Good Morning Britain with Piers Morgan, and outlets like CNBC, Forbes, Mashable, the New York Times, the Wall Street Journal, the Guardian, and the Tonight Show Starring Jimmy Fallon. Sophia was featured in AUDI's annual report and was featured on the cover of the December 2016 issue of ELLE Brasil. R. Eric Thomas later lampooned Sophia on Elle.com.

Sophia has been interviewed in the same manner as a human, striking up conversations with hosts. Some replies have been nonsensical, while others have impressed interviewers such as 60 Minutess Charlie Rose. 

In an October 2017 interview for CNBC, when the interviewer expressed concerns about robot behavior, Sophia joked that he had "been reading too much Elon Musk. And watching too many Hollywood movies". Musk tweeted that Sophia should watch The Godfather and asked "what's the worst that could happen?"

Business Insider's chief UK editor Jim Edwards interviewed Sophia, and while the answers were "not altogether terrible", he predicted that Sophia was a step towards "conversational artificial intelligence". At the 2018 Consumer Electronics Show, a BBC News reporter described talking with Sophia as "a slightly awkward experience".

In May 2018, photographer Giulio Di Sturco did a photo shoot of Sophia which appeared in National Geographic. Wired reported on the shoot.

Citizenship quandary 
Saudi Arabia's move of granting citizenship to Sophia immediately raised questions, as commentators wondered if this implied that Sophia could vote or marry, or whether a deliberate system shutdown could be considered murder. 

While some sources characterized the move as a publicity stunt on the part of the Saudi government to promote the conference, other sources have treated it seriously. Tyler L. Jaynes writes that there was a "lack of universal acceptance of Sophia the Robot’s citizenship and its portrayal and acceptance as a public relations stunt". Jaynes goes on to note that "a refusal to seriously treat this event as being legitimate already displays the struggles that will be faced by patients undergoing surgical augmentation when integrating self-learning artificial intelligence systems (SLAIS) into their chemically organic forms."

Simon Nease, writing in the Penn Politcal Review, suggests that it was a competitive move on the part of Saudi Arabia to attract AI and robotics companies to the country, noting that "Japan has also made preliminary provisions for AI obtaining citizenship". The British Council has published an article, "Should robots be citizens?", which notes that Sophia was issued a passport and goes on to address the "legal quandary" of robot citizenship. In October 2022, the US Office of Digital Strategy issued "A Blueprint for an AI Bill of Rights" on Whitehouse.gov.

Criticism 
According to Quartz, experts who have reviewed the robot's partially open-source code state that Sophia is best categorized as a chatbot with a face. 

According to The Verge, Hanson has exaggerated Sophia's capacity for consciousness, for example by having said that Sophia is "basically alive", which Verge writer James Vincent described as "grossly misleading". In a piece produced by CNBC which indicates that their own interview questions for Sophia were heavily rewritten by its creators, Goertzel responds to the Hanson quote by suggesting Hanson means Sophia is "alive" in the way that, to a sculptor, a piece of sculpture becomes "alive" in the sculptor's eyes as the work nears completion.

In January 2018, Facebook's director of artificial intelligence, Yann LeCun, tweeted that Sophia was "complete bullshit" and slammed the media for giving coverage to "Potemkin AI". In response, Ben Goertzel, the former chief scientist for the company that made Sophia, stated he had never suggested that Sophia was close to human-level intelligence.

Goertzel has also acknowledged that it is "not ideal" that some think of Sophia as having human-equivalent intelligence, but argues Sophia's presentation conveys something unique to audiences, saying "If I show them a beautiful smiling robot face, then they get the feeling that AGI may indeed be nearby and viable" and "None of this is what I would call AGI, but nor is it simple to get working. And it is absolutely cutting-edge in terms of dynamic integration of perception, action, and dialogue".

In popular culture
Sophia has appeared in videos and music videos, including The White King, and as the lead female character in pop singer Leehom Wang’s music video A.I.

A Sophia lookalike was portrayed by drag queen Gigi Goode in the "Snatch Game" episode of the twelfth season of RuPaul’s Drag Race (2020).  Goode won the episode with her character "Maria the Robot", based heavily on Sophia and named after a robot featured in the Fritz Lang film Metropolis.

See also 
 ELIZA effect
 Ethics of artificial intelligence
 Stranger in a Strange Land

References

Works cited
 
 
 
  
 
 
 
 
 
 
 
 
 
 
 
 
 
  
 
 
 
 
 
 
 
 
 
 

Media

Further reading

External links 

 Sophia's open-source code on GitHub
 

2016 robots
Android (robot)
Free and open-source software
Humanoid robots
Robots of China
Robots of Saudi Arabia
Saudi Arabian nationality law
Saudi Arabian people
Science and technology in Hong Kong
Social robots